Zubné is a village and municipality in Humenné District in the Prešov Region of north-east Slovakia.

History
In historical records the village was first mentioned in 1557.

Geography
The municipality lies at an altitude from 212 to 540 metres and covers an area of 1998 ha.
It has a population of about 356 people.

References

External links
 
https://web.archive.org/web/20071217080336/http://www.statistics.sk/mosmis/eng/run.html 

Villages and municipalities in Humenné District